Irina-Camelia Begu and Andreea Mitu were the defending champions, but chose to participate with different partners. Begu played alongside Raluca Olaru, while Mitu teamed up with Lara Arruabarrena. Both teams lost to Jaqueline Cristian and Elena-Gabriela Ruse in the semifinals and quarterfinals, respectively.

Viktória Kužmová and Kristýna Plíšková won the title, defeating Cristian and Ruse in the final, 6–4, 7–6(7–3).

Seeds

Draw

Draw

References

External Links
Main Draw

Bucharest Open - Doubles
BRD Bucharest Open